Dermot Patrick Kinlen (24 April 1930 – 18 July 2007) was best known for being the first inspector of prisons in Ireland. In his reports he was very critical of the way the prison service was being run and in particular of the lack of any focus on rehabilitation.

He had previously been a High Court Judge, having been nominated by Dick Spring of the Labour Party, in spite of his links to Fianna Fáil.  He practiced on the South Western Circuit.  He had a charismatic personality, vast wide-ranging interests and was much admired.

He was involved in the setting up of diplomatic relations between The People's Republic of China and Ireland. From 1977 onwards he was a frequent visitor to China. The University of Limerick awarded him an honorary Doctorate of Law.

In 1997, Pope John Paul II bestowed the Order of St. Gregory on Kinlen.

Kinlen's maternal grandfather, Thomas O'Donnell, had been an MP for West Kerry for 18 years, at the beginning of the 20th century.

Kinlen died in his Kerry home on 18 July 2007 and was buried in Dublin on 21 July 2007.

References

1930 births
2007 deaths
High Court judges (Ireland)
Irish barristers
Alumni of King's Inns
Knights Commander of the Order of St Gregory the Great